The 1982–83 NBA season was the Lakers' 35th season in the NBA and the 23rd season in Los Angeles. The Lakers were attempting to become the first team since the Boston Celtics in 1969 to repeat as NBA Champions. However, on April 10, 1983, rookie James Worthy injured his leg while attempting a putback in a home loss against Phoenix, ending his rookie season. Even without Worthy for the playoffs, the Lakers did make it to the NBA Finals, only to be swept in four games by the Julius Erving and Moses Malone led Philadelphia 76ers.

NBA Draft
The Lakers were the defending league champions, which normally results in a low draft position, but the Lakers had the top pick in the Draft thanks to a trade made years earlier.  On February 15, 1980, the Lakers sent Don Ford and their top pick in the 1980 NBA Draft (who turned out to be Chad Kinch) in exchange for Butch Lee and the Cleveland Cavaliers' top pick in the 1982 NBA Draft. Prior to the implementation of the NBA Draft Lottery in 1985, the teams with the two worst records from the previous season would engage in a coin flip to determine which team would receive the top pick.  Therefore, when Cleveland finished with the worst record in 1981-82, the Lakers took their place in the coin flip, and won out over the San Diego Clippers to earn the top pick.

Roster

Regular season

Season standings

Record vs. opponents

Game log

Playoffs

|- align="center" bgcolor="#ccffcc"
| 1
| April 24
| Portland
| W 118–97
| Kareem Abdul-Jabbar (32)
| Johnson, Rambis (9)
| Magic Johnson (18)
| The Forum13,891
| 1–0
|- align="center" bgcolor="#ccffcc"
| 2
| April 26
| Portland
| W 112–106
| Kareem Abdul-Jabbar (37)
| Jamaal Wilkes (9)
| Kareem Abdul-Jabbar (7)
| The Forum16,239
| 2–0
|- align="center" bgcolor="#ccffcc"
| 3
| April 29
| @ Portland
| W 115–109 (OT)
| Kareem Abdul-Jabbar (30)
| Jamaal Wilkes (9)
| Magic Johnson (11)
| Memorial Coliseum12,666
| 3–0
|- align="center" bgcolor="#ffcccc"
| 4
| May 1
| @ Portland
| L 95–108
| Kareem Abdul-Jabbar (34)
| Kareem Abdul-Jabbar (9)
| Magic Johnson (8)
| Memorial Coliseum12,666
| 3–1
|- align="center" bgcolor="#ccffcc"
| 5
| May 3
| Portland
| W 116–108
| Norm Nixon (36)
| Kareem Abdul-Jabbar (11)
| Magic Johnson (15)
| The Forum16,739
| 4–1
|-

|- align="center" bgcolor="#ccffcc"
| 1
| May 8
| San Antonio
| W 119–107
| Abdul-Jabbar, Nixon (30)
| three players tied (8)
| Magic Johnson (12)
| The Forum15,063
| 1–0
|- align="center" bgcolor="#ffcccc"
| 2
| May 10
| San Antonio
| L 113–122
| Johnson, Nixon (28)
| Magic Johnson (12)
| Norm Nixon (11)
| The Forum17,505
| 1–1
|- align="center" bgcolor="#ccffcc"
| 3
| May 13
| @ San Antonio
| W 113–100
| Jamaal Wilkes (26)
| Magic Johnson (11)
| Magic Johnson (13)
| HemisFair Arena15,782
| 2–1
|- align="center" bgcolor="#ccffcc"
| 4
| May 15
| @ San Antonio
| W 129–121
| Magic Johnson (31)
| Magic Johnson (8)
| Magic Johnson (17)
| HemisFair Arena15,782
| 3–1
|- align="center" bgcolor="#ffcccc"
| 5
| May 18
| San Antonio
| L 112–117
| Kareem Abdul-Jabbar (30)
| Magic Johnson (11)
| Magic Johnson (19)
| The Forum17,505
| 3–2
|- align="center" bgcolor="#ccffcc"
| 6
| May 20
| @ San Antonio
| W 101–100
| Kareem Abdul-Jabbar (28)
| Magic Johnson (15)
| Magic Johnson (16)
| HemisFair Arena15,782
| 4–2
|-

|- align="center" bgcolor="#ffcccc"
| 1
| May 22
| @ Philadelphia
| L 107–113
| Norm Nixon (26)
| Mark Landsberger (10)
| Magic Johnson (11)
| Spectrum18,482
| 0–1
|- align="center" bgcolor="#ffcccc"
| 2
| May 26
| @ Philadelphia
| L 93–103
| Kareem Abdul-Jabbar (23)
| Magic Johnson (8)
| Magic Johnson (13)
| Spectrum18,482
| 0–2
|- align="center" bgcolor="#ffcccc"
| 3
| May 29
| Philadelphia
| L 94–111
| Kareem Abdul-Jabbar (23)
| Kareem Abdul-Jabbar (15)
| Magic Johnson (13)
| The Forum17,505
| 0–3
|- align="center" bgcolor="#ffcccc"
| 4
| May 31
| Philadelphia
| L 108–115
| Kareem Abdul-Jabbar (28)
| four players tied (7)
| Magic Johnson (15)
| The Forum17,505
| 0–4
|-

Player statistics
Note: GP= Games played; MPG= Minutes per Game; REB = Rebounds; AST = Assists; STL = Steals; BLK = Blocks; PTS = Points; PPG = Points per Game

Season

Playoffs

Award winners/Honors
 Kareem Abdul-Jabbar, Second Team All-NBA, All-Star
 Michael Cooper, Second Team All-Defense
 Magic Johnson, First Team All-NBA, All-Star
 Jamaal Wilkes, All-Star
 James Worthy, First Team All-Rookie

Transactions

References

 Lakers on Database Basketball
 Lakers on Basketball Reference

Los Angeles Lakers seasons
Western Conference (NBA) championship seasons
Los
Los Angle
Los Angle